Beth Daniel (born October 14, 1956) is an American professional golfer. She became a member of the LPGA Tour in 1979 and won 33 LPGA Tour events, including one major championship, during her career. She is a member of the World Golf Hall of Fame.

Early life and amateur career
Daniel was born on October 14, 1956 in Charleston, South Carolina. She played her collegiate golf at Furman University, and was on the 1976 national championship team that included future LPGA players Betsy King, Sherri Turner and Cindy Ferro. In 1977, she won the Broderick Award (now the Honda Sports Award) as the nation's best female collegiate golfer. Daniel won the U.S. Women's Amateur in 1975 and 1977, the Women's Western Amateur in 1978, and was on the U.S. Curtis Cup teams in 1976 and 1978 (going 4-0 in 1976). She turned pro at the end of 1978 and joined the LPGA Tour in 1979.

Professional career
Daniel's first victory came in 1979 year at the Patty Berg Classic, and she went on to win the LPGA Rookie of the Year award. Over the next five years, when Nancy Lopez was at her most dominant, she still managed to win 13 tournaments, including four in 1980 when she was named LPGA Tour Player of the Year. Daniel led the Tour in wins in 1982, 1990 and 1994. She also led in scoring three times, including in 1989 when she became the second golfer in Tour history to record a scoring average below 71.00.

The year 1990 was Daniel’s most successful on tour. She won seven times, including her lone major at the Mazda LPGA Championship. That year she was also named the Associated Press Female Athlete of the Year. Along the way, she endured two major slumps. She was winless from 1986 to 1988 and again from 1996 to 2002. When she finally won again in 2003, she became - at age 46 years, 8 months and 29 days - the oldest winner in Tour history. She had outlasted most of her contemporaries such as King, Patty Sheehan and Amy Alcott, remaining competitive on the LPGA Tour.

Daniel won the Golf Writers Association of America Female Player of the Year in 1980 and 1990. She also won the 1981 Seagrams Seven Crowns of Sport Award for women’s golf. She was inducted into the South Carolina Golf Hall of Fame in September 1995.  She was recognized during the LPGA’s 50th Anniversary in 2000 as one of the LPGA’s top-50 players and teachers.

Daniel played on eight U.S. Solheim Cup teams (1990, 1992, 1994, 1996, 2000, 2002, 2003, 2005).

By 2005 Daniel had cut back her schedule, and played just five events by 2007. That year she also served as assistant captain on the U.S. Solheim Cup team, and was named captain for the American squad in 2009. In 2007, she joined the Golf Channel as a substitute analyst for LPGA Tournament coverage.  Her first event was the 2007 Safeway Classic.

Daniel also awards the best junior female golfer in South Carolina with the Beth Daniel Award.  The award is given to the player with the most SCJGA (South Carolina Junior Golf Association) points in a year.

In 2009, Daniel was the captain of the U.S. Solheim Cup team that defeated Europe by a score of 16-12 at Rich Harvest Farms in Sugar Grove, Illinois.

Professional wins (41)

LPGA Tour wins (33)

LPGA Tour playoff record (5–6)

LPGA of Japan Tour wins (4)
1979 World Ladies
1988 Nichirei International
1990 Konica Cup World Ladies
1991 Konica Cup World Ladies

Other wins (4)
1981 JCPenney Mixed Team Classic (with Tom Kite)
1990 JCPenney Classic (with Davis Love III)
1995 JCPenney Classic (with Davis Love III)
1999 World Golf Hall of Fame Championship (with Johnny Miller)

Major championships

Wins (1)

Results timeline

^ The Women's British Open replaced the du Maurier Classic as an LPGA major in 2001.

CUT = missed the half-way cut.
WD = withdrew
T = tied

Summary
Starts – 105
Wins – 1
2nd-place finishes – 6
3rd-place finishes – 3
Top 3 finishes – 10
Top 5 finishes – 16
Top 10 finishes – 33
Top 25 finishes – 60
Missed cuts – 13
Most consecutive cuts made – 23
Longest streak of top-10s – 5 (twice)

U.S. national team appearances
Amateur
Curtis Cup: 1976 (winners), 1978 (winners)
Espirito Santo Trophy: 1978

Professional
Solheim Cup: 1990 (winners), 1992, 1994 (winners), 1996 (winners), 2000, 2002 (winners), 2003, 2005 (winners), 2009 (non-playing captain, winners)
World Cup: 2005
Handa Cup: 2007 (winners), 2008 (winners), 2009 (winners), 2010 (winners), 2011 (winners), 2012 (tie, Cup retained), 2013, 2014 (winners), 2015 (winners)

See also
List of golfers with most LPGA Tour wins
List of golfers with most LPGA major championship wins

References

External links

American female golfers
Furman Paladins women's golfers
LPGA Tour golfers
Winners of ladies' major amateur golf championships
Winners of LPGA major golf championships
Solheim Cup competitors for the United States
World Golf Hall of Fame inductees
Golfers from South Carolina
Golfers from Florida
Women sports announcers
Sportspeople from Charleston, South Carolina
Sportspeople from Delray Beach, Florida
1956 births
Living people